Vox maris, Op. 31, is a symphonic poem composed between 1929 and 1954 by the Romanian composer George Enescu, dedicated to the memory of the great Romanian pianist Elena Bibescu.

References

Further reading
 Bentoiu, Pascal. 2010. Masterworks of George Enescu: A Detailed Analysis, translated by Lory Wallfisch. Lanham, MD: Scarecrow Press.  (cloth)  (ebook).
 Firca, Clemansa, and Ștefan Niculescu. 1971. "Esențializări (1945–1955)". In George Enescu: Monografie, 2 vols., edited by Mircea Voicana, 1017–1138. Bucharest: Editura Academiei Republicii Socialiste România.
 Stihi-Boos, Constantin. 1976. "A Few Aspects of the Musical Transfiguration of the Literary Pretext in the Symphonic Poem Vox maris by George Enescu". In Enesciana I: La personnalité artistique de Georges Enesco: Travaux de la Première Session Scientifique du Centre d'Études "Georges Enesco", Bucarest, 19 septembre 1973, edited by Mircea Voicana, 141–50. Bucharest: Editura Academiei Republicii Socialiste România.
 Stihi-Boos, Constantin. 1981. "Some Analytical Specifications Concerning the Symphonic Poem Vox maris in G Major Op. 31 by George Enescu". In Enesciana II–III: Georges Enesco, musicien complexe, edited by Mircea Voicana, 187–92. Bucharest: Editura Academiei Republicii Socialiste România.
 Stihi-Boos, Constantin. 1981. "Două precizări analitice privitoare la poemul orchestral românesc din prima jumătate a secolului nostru". Bucharest: Editura Muzicală.

Compositions by George Enescu
1954 compositions
Symphonic poems